Pierre Fisson, (1918 in Tbilisi, Georgia – July 2013), was a French writer, laureate of the Prix Renaudot in 1948.

Life 
Fisson was born of a French father and a Georgian mother. He made all his studies in Paris. During the Second World War, he was appointed an aspirant in 1939 and took up the maquis in 1942. After the Liberation of France, he worked as an attaché with the American General Staff in Berlin, then became a press attaché in Mexico. He then became a journalist and writer.

He was awarded the prix Renaudot in 1948 for his first novel, .

Works 
 1948: Voyage aux horizons Éditions Julliard – Prix Renaudot
 1950: Les Certitudes équivoques.
 1950: Les Princes du tumulte. Éditions Julliard
 1952: Les Amants de Séoul.
 1954: Le Mercenaire
 1958: La Butte aux ronces. Éditions Julliard
 1961: Si on te prend ta robe. Éditions Julliard
 1965: Les Rendez-vous de Moscou. Éditions Robert Laffont
 1967: Les Automobiles : récits des temps actuels. Éditions Robert Laffont

References

1918 births
2013 deaths
Soviet emigrants to France
20th-century French novelists
French male novelists
Prix Renaudot winners
French Resistance members